Barry Winch (born 17 April 1958) is a British gymnast. He competed at the 1980 Summer Olympics and the 1984 Summer Olympics.

References

1958 births
Living people
British male artistic gymnasts
Olympic gymnasts of Great Britain
Gymnasts at the 1980 Summer Olympics
Gymnasts at the 1984 Summer Olympics
People from Carshalton